The Tornado outbreak sequence of May 2004 was a series of tornado outbreaks that affected much of southern Ontario, the Central and Southern United States from east of the Rockies to the Mid-Atlantic States from May 21 to May 31, 2004. Particularly hard hit were the central Plains from Missouri to Iowa and the Ohio Valley. The Central Plains were hit by two significant outbreaks on May 22 and May 24, the first outbreak of which produced a very large and violent tornado in Hallam, Nebraska. The Ohio Valley was affected by one of the largest tornado outbreaks ever during the Memorial Day weekend on May 29–30.

Seven people were killed in four states during the entire event. In all, 389 tornadoes were confirmed over an 11-day period – close to the number of tornadoes in the May 2003 tornado outbreak sequence which affected more or less the same area. However, the 2003 outbreak sequence produced several more destructive and violent tornadoes and had a much higher death toll than in May 2004.

Confirmed tornadoes

Hallam tornado outbreak

The Hallam, Nebraska tornado outbreak was a outbreak of 56 tornadoes in several Midwestern U.S. states on the evening of May 22, 2004 and the first of a series of tornado events. Most of the tornadoes occurred in Nebraska and Iowa.  On that day, a warm, moist airmass was sitting over Nebraska while an upper level low developed in Colorado, with an attending dryline forming ahead of the advancing cold front. One person was killed in this outbreak, 38 were injured and there was $175 million in damage.  The worst tornado was an F4 that struck Hallam, Nebraska. The violent tornado was ranked as one of the widest tornadoes on record, with the funnel stretching 2.5 miles (4 km) wide as it passed through Hallam. This record was surpassed on May 31, 2013 by an EF3 tornado in El Reno, Oklahoma that reached 2.6 miles wide.

Timeline
The first tornado in this outbreak touched down at 1:15 MDT near La Grange, Wyoming.  It was an F0 and did not cause any significant damage. After another small tornado touched down in Colorado, several tornadoes began to form in Nebraska and Iowa during the mid–afternoon hours where they continued until around 11:00 p.m CDT. The most damaging tornado in the outbreak first touched down at 7:30 p.m. CDT in northwestern Jefferson County.  The tornado then moved to the northeast, through southern Saline County and northwestern Gage County.  By the time it entered Lancaster County, it measured an F4 on the Fujita scale and the damage path was 2.5 miles (4 km) wide.  The tornado passed into Otoe County, disappearing just west of Palmyra at 9:10. The tornado had a path length of about 54 miles, and was on the ground for 100 minutes.

Damage

The village of Hallam, struck at 8:33 p.m., was the  hardest hit. Approximately 95% of the buildings in Hallam were damaged or destroyed.  There were 37 people injured and one fatality in the village.  The Norris School District 160 high school building was severely damaged; its auditorium was destroyed.  Straight-line winds caused damage in Princeton.  Several farms and rural homes suffered extensive damage. This storm also derailed a freight train and left it lying 20 feet away from the railroad. Other significant damage occurred from an F2 tornado in Adams and Clay counties, Nebraska.  Fifteen homes were damaged and another train was overturned, resulting in $5.5 million in damages.

Memorial Weekend outbreak

The Memorial Day Weekend 2004 tornado outbreak was the largest continuous tornado outbreak ever recorded in the month of May. It lasted for two days from May 29–30, 2004 with the final tornadoes occurring during the early morning hours of May 31. This tornado outbreak began in the Great Plains and continued throughout the Midwest. Tornadoes on the 29th were focused from the Dakotas to Missouri and Oklahoma before shifting east to the Mississippi, Ohio and Tennessee Valleys on the 30th.

The official Storm Data archives from NOAA list a total of 168 tornadoes during the two-day period. Unofficial storm reports compiled by the Storm Prediction Center indicated 199 tornadoes, but these reports are strictly preliminary and are not quality controlled to the degree of Storm Data publications.

The 168 tornadoes occurred in 32 hours of continuous activity, which would not at all break the record held by the 1974 Super Outbreak, which saw 148 tornadoes in 18 hours. There was also a greater number of large and violent tornadoes in the Super Outbreak event. Most of the tornadoes were produced by supercells, though a few were produced by the following squall line. There were also widespread wind damage reports from a large squall line that moved through after the tornadoes. Damage totals from this outbreak are at $62.321 million.

The tornado outbreak killed at least 5 people across two states including 4 in Missouri and 1 in Indiana. 3 of the fatalities were caused by an F4 tornado that struck the Weatherby area in DeKalb County, Missouri late during the evening of May 29. Another person was killed in the St. Louis Metropolitan area while the fifth fatality was northwest of Louisville, Kentucky in the Marengo area where 80% of the town was damaged or destroyed.

In addition, an F2 tornado on May 30 affected portions of the Indianapolis Metropolitan Area just a few hours after the Indianapolis 500 was taking place. The tornado missed the Indianapolis Motor Speedway by six miles and forced post-racing events to be held indoors. The tornado did however cause extensive damage across southern and eastern Marion County south of the downtown area. While 26 people were injured, over 700 structures were damaged by the storm.

Other outbreaks

Several other smaller tornado outbreaks took place between May 21 to May 31, 2004 and affected many of the regions impacted by the two main outbreaks. On May 21, a series of tornadoes hit Iowa causing major damage to the town of Bradgate where 75% of the buildings were either damaged or destroyed. On this day, several clusters of thunderstorms traveled from the Midwest to the Mid-Atlantic States producing widespread damaging wind and weaker tornadoes across Michigan.

On May 24, several tornadoes touched down across the Great Plains and the Mid-Mississippi Valley. Most tornadoes were weak although one person was killed in Illinois inside a mobile home.

On May 26–27, several tornadoes affected portions of the Ohio Valley. One tornado north of Louisville producing significant damage in Washington and Clark Counties. An F3 tornado tore through a residential subdivision just north of Lexington, Kentucky causing major damage to about 50 homes.

See also
 List of North American tornadoes and tornado outbreaks
 List of Canadian tornadoes and tornado outbreaks

References

External links

May 22
 Hallam Nebraska Tornado (NWS Omaha, Nebraska)
 Summary of the Storms of May 22nd and 24th, 2004 (NWS Hastings, Nebraska)
 May 22, 2004 Tornado Report (University of Nebraska–Lincoln)
 22 May 2004 - Severe Convection in Nebraska and Iowa (CIMSS, SSEC, University of Wisconsin–Madison)

May 24
 Storm images from May 24 tornadoes in Kansas and Nebraska

May 29–31
May 29, 2004: Tornadoes across Northwest Missouri (NWS Kansas City, Missouri)
May 30, 2004 Tornado Outbreak (NWS Indianapolis, Indiana)
F3 tornado strikes Peru, Indiana (NWS Northern Indiana)
Severe Weather Outbreak of May 30, 2004 (NWS Central Illinois)
30 May 2004 Event (NWS St. Louis)
Jefferson County, Kentucky Tornado Damage (NWS Louisville, Kentucky)
Floyd County, Indiana Tornado Damage (NWS Louisville, Kentucky)
Crawford County, Indiana (Marengo) Tornado Damage (NWS Louisville, Kentucky)
Clark County, Indiana Tornado Damage (NWS Louisville, Kentucky)
Tornadoes in the Paducah county warning area (NWS Paducah, Kentucky)

F4 tornadoes by date
 ,2004-05-22
Tornadoes of 2004
Tornadoes in Indiana
Tornadoes in Illinois
Tornadoes in Iowa
Tornadoes in Kansas
Tornadoes in Kentucky
Tornadoes in Missouri
Tornadoes in Nebraska
Tornadoes in Oklahoma
Tornadoes in Canada by date
2004-05-22
Tornado outbreaks
2004 natural disasters in the United States
May 2004 events in North America